The Lotus Etna is a one-off concept car designed by Giorgetto Giugiaro, who also designed the Lotus Esprit. It premiered at the 1984 British International Motor Show. It is powered by a 4.0-litre V8 of Lotus design, code-named the Type 909.

External links
LotusSpiritTurbo.com
Conceptcarz.com

Etna
Italdesign concept vehicles